A Formula E car is an open-wheel auto racing car made according to the regulations of the International Automobile Federation (FIA) to take part in the FIA Formula E Championship. Formula E is a sport for electric cars, and they are powered by batteries and an electric motor. Races are mainly driven on closed temporary street circuits designed specifically for this racing category.

Generations 
As of 2022 there have been three major generations of Formula E cars:
 1st generation (2014–15 to 2017–18)
 1st season: 2014–15
 2nd season: 2015–16
 3rd season: 2016–17
 4th season: 2017–18
 2nd generation (2018–19 to 2021–22)
 5th season: 2018–19
 6th season: 2019–20
 7th season: 2020–21
 8th season: 2021-2022
 3rd generation (from 2023)
 9th season: 2022-2023

1st generation (2014–15 to 2017–18) 

Even though the FIA originally planned for the category to be open to various chassis manufacturers, the only licensed Formula E model for the inaugural season (2014–2015) was the Spark-Renault SRT 01E. The electric components were assembled by Renault while the chassis was designed by Dallara, and the car was assembled by Spark Racing Technology.

In Season 2 (2015–16), the SRT_01E was opened up for private development by the teams when it came to the motor, gearbox and suspensions.

The specifications for the Spark-Renault SRT_01E are:

2nd generation (2018–19 to 2021–22) 

In March 2016 it was decided by the FIA and Formula E Holdings that the upcoming 2nd generation cars would keep to a specification chassis in a bid to keep costs low in the category. The tender for the 2nd Generation car was won by Spark Racing Technology.

The original battery specifications included a  cell-weight limit, a 200 kW peak power limit, and a maximum usable energy of 28 kWh. For the 2018–2019 season, the specifications for the battery was a weight of 250 kg and 54 kWh energy, and peak power was 250 kW. The cells (18650VTC6) was to be made by Murata Manufacturing, the integration by Lucid Motors, and track handling by McLaren.

Also new for the generation 2 cars was the inclusion of a halo crash protection device.

The specifications for the Spark SRT05e are:

3rd generation (from 2022) 
The 3rd generation of Formula E cars is expected to be lighter and smaller than the 2nd generation cars to allow for more wheel-to-wheel racing. It will be the first formula car with both front and rear powertrains, with a 250 kW generator in the front being used for regenerative braking and a 350 kW engine in the rear for powering the vehicle. It will be the first formula car not to feature rear hydraulic brakes, and will instead rely on the regenerative capabilities of the engines for braking on the rear wheels, and it is claimed that "at least 40% of the energy used within a race will be produced by regenerative braking during the race". This contributes to the car, at the launch in 2022, being expected to become the world's most energy efficient race car ever. Performance wise, the 3rd generation Formula E cars are expected to achieve around 2 to 4 seconds faster lap times in both qualifying and races compared to the 2nd generation cars.

The specifications for the 3rd generation Formula E cars are:

Transmission 
During the first season in 2014–2015, all teams used a Hewland 5-speed sequential gearbox operated by the driver semi-automatically via paddles on the steering wheel similar to Formula 1. In the following seasons, regulations on gearboxes have been relaxed, and some teams have chosen to use either single-speed gears or all the way up to four gears. A transmission with multiple gears can help keep the motor in its most efficient operating range, but whether an electric car needs multiple gears in the transmission depends heavily on the torque curve of the motor at different rotational speeds (r/min). By season 4 in 2017–2018, all teams were running single-speed gearboxes. Some single-speed Formula E cars have sometimes erroneously been described as having a "direct-drive" powertrain. However, FIA regulations for the gen 1 and 2 car have mandated a reduction gear, and Formula E cars without multi-speed gearboxes have thus far had a single-speed gear rather than a true direct-drive mechanism.

Sound 
The second generation Formula E car from 2017 had a noise level of about 80 decibels, which is 10 dB louder than an average petrol road car or about as loud as a domestic vacuum cleaner.

See also 
 Formula E
 2014–15 Formula E Championship
 2015–16 Formula E Championship
 2016–17 Formula E Championship
 2017–18 Formula E Championship
 2018–19 Formula E Championship
 2019–20 Formula E Championship
2020–21 Formula E World Championship
2021–22 Formula E World Championship
2022–23 Formula E World Championship

Notes and references

External links 
 Official site
 (fr) La Spark-Renault SRT01E en images - Abcmoteur.fr, September 22, 2013

Electric cars
Formula E